Burning Bush is an unincorporated community in Catoosa County, in the U.S. state of Georgia.

Etymology
Burning Bush was named after a local church.

References

Unincorporated communities in Catoosa County, Georgia
Unincorporated communities in Georgia (U.S. state)